Ladislaus Josephovich Bortkiewicz (Russian Владислав Иосифович Борткевич, German Ladislaus von Bortkiewicz or Ladislaus von Bortkewitsch) (7 August 1868 – 15 July 1931) was a Russian economist and statistician of Polish ancestry. He wrote a book showing how the Poisson distribution, a discrete probability distribution, can be useful in applied statistics, and he made contributions to mathematical economics. He lived most of his professional life in Germany, where he taught at Strassburg University (Privatdozent, 1895–1897) and Berlin University (1901–1931).

Life and work
Ladislaus Bortkiewicz was born in Saint Petersburg, Imperial Russia, to two ethnic Polish parents: Józef Bortkiewicz and Helena Bortkiewicz (née Rokicka). His father was a Polish nobleman who served in the Russian Imperial Army.

Bortkiewicz graduated from the Law Faculty in 1890. In 1898 he published a book about the Poisson distribution, titled The Law of Small Numbers. In this book he first noted that events with low frequency in a large population follow a Poisson distribution even when the probabilities of the events varied. It was that book that made the Prussian horse-kicking data famous. The data gave the number of soldiers killed by being kicked by a horse each year in each of 14 cavalry corps over a 20-year period. Bortkiewicz showed that those numbers followed a Poisson distribution. The book also examined data on child-suicides. Some have suggested that the Poisson distribution should have been named the "Bortkiewicz distribution."

In political economy, Bortkiewicz is important for his analysis of Karl Marx's reproduction schema in the last two volumes of Capital. Bortkiewicz identified a transformation problem in Marx's work. Making use of Dmitriev's analysis of Ricardo, Bortkiewicz proved that the data used by Marx was sufficient to calculate the general profit rate and relative prices. Though Marx's transformation procedure was not correct—because it did not calculate prices and profit rate simultaneously, but sequentially—Bortkiewicz has shown that it is possible to get the correct results using the Marxian framework, i.e. using the marxian variables constant capital and variable capital it is possible to obtain the profit rate and the relative prices in a three-sector model. This "correction of the Marxian system" has been the great contribution of Bortkiewicz to classical and Marxian economics but it was completely unnoticed until Paul Sweezy's 1942 book "Theory of Capitalist Development". Piero Sraffa (1960) has provided the complete generalization of the simultaneous method for classical and Marxian analysis.

Bortkiewicz died in Berlin, Germany. His papers, including a voluminous correspondence file (some 1,000 letters 1876–1931), were deposited at Uppsala University in Sweden, except for his correspondence with Léon Walras which went into the collection of the Walras scholar William Jaffé in the USA.

Major publications
Die mittlere Lebensdauer. Die Methoden ihrer Bestimmung und ihr Verhältnis zur Sterblichkeitsmessung. Gustav Fischer, Jena 1893 (Göttinger Digitalisierungszentrum)
"Review of Léon Walras, Éléments d'économie politique pure, 2e édit.", 1890, Revue d'économie politique

  
  — Article's English translation (Value and Price in the Marxian System), 1952, International Economic Papers, No.2
 
  — Spanish version 1917 * Original German version
  
"Die Rodbertus'sche Grundrententheorie und die Marx'sche Lehre von der absoluten Grundrente", from: "Archiv für die Geschichte des Sozialismus und der Arbeiterbewegung", 1910–11

See also
Mihajlo D. Mesarovic

Notes

References
Joseph Schumpeter. Ladislaus von Bortkiewicz, Economic Journal, Vol. 42 (1932), pp. 338–340, reprinted in: Ten great economists from Marx to Keynes (New York, 1960), pp. 302–305
Emil Julius Gumbel. Ladislaus von Bortkiewicz, International Encyclopedia of the Social Sciences 2 (New York, 1968), pp. 128–131. Freely available online at StatProb @ Internet Archive Wayback Machine
Paul A. Samuelson. Resolving a Historical Confusion in Population Analysis. Human Biology, 48, 1976: pp. 559–580

External links

 Biographical sketch on the web site of the University of St. Andrews (in Scotland)
 Ladislaus von Bortkiewicz from encyclopedia.com
 New School: Ladislaus von Bortkiewicz
 Ladislaus von Bortkiewicz — statistician, economist, and a European intellectual, SFB 649 Discussion Paper 2014-015

1868 births
1931 deaths
Russian economists
Mathematicians from Saint Petersburg
Russian statisticians
People from the Russian Empire of Polish descent
Marxian economists
Academic staff of the Humboldt University of Berlin
Fellows of the Royal Statistical Society
Members of the Royal Swedish Academy of Sciences